Kaamyab ( Successful) is an Indian Hindi-language action film, produced by G. Hanumantha Rao by Padmalaya Studios banner, presented by Krishna and directed by K. Raghavendra Rao. Starring Jeetendra, Shabana Azmi, Radha  (in her Hindi film debut) and music composed by Bappi Lahari. The film is remake of Telugu Movie Shakti (1983), starring Krishna, Jaya Sudha, Radha in pivotal roles.

Plot
The film begins in a village where Mahadev a bent cheapskate racks the farmers by providing loans. Ram son of an ex-military returns home after many years and encounters Mahadev. Ram loves his childhood friend Seeta daughter of postmaster Dindayal. Mahadev keeps an evil eye on her, in turn, he is mocked. To pay back he denounces Seeta as a worse before the village which leads to her father’s death. However, Ram proves Seeta unsullied and espouses Seeta. Soon, Ram learns that the land allocated by the Govt for his father's valor has been pledged to Mahadev. Hence, Ram gets back it, by selling his property, and strives to cultivate the wasteland along with Seeta. Time passes, and Ram & Seeta are blessed with two sons Rajesh & Kishan and live buoyantly. Ram aims to tune Rajesh as a farmer to mold Kishan into a high official. Eventually, Ram always uphill battles with Mahadev, so, intrigues, and kills Ram by backstabbing. Before dying, he takes an oath from Seeta to achieve his goal.

Years roll by, and Rajesh married an avaricious woman Parvati. Kishan a meritorious student in college falls for beauty queen Radha. All goes well until Parvati’s wicked cousin Janardhan / Dhan walks in. Indeed, he is a smuggler circulating fake currency. Currently, Dhan fuses with Mahadev and ploy by luring Rajesh into a business to carry out their work undercover. Rajesh mortgages his land at Mahadev and acquires the amount. Knowing it, Seeta reproaches when a rift arises and Rajesh quits the house. Thereafter, Mahadev addicts Rajesh to all sorts of vices and breaches a dam in which the entire crop has vanished when Seeta collapses. During that plight, Kishan arrives, cognizant of the entire fact, and confronts Mahadev. Parallelly, Mahadev & Dhan double-cross Rajesh by indicting him for the crime which makes to realize. At last, Kishan rescues his brother, proves his innocence, and ceases Mahadev. Finally, the movie ends on a happy note Seeta successfully fulfilling Ram’s dream.

Cast
Jeetendra Ram / Krishna (Dual Role)
Shabana Azmi as Sita
Radha as Radha
Amjad Khan as Mahadev
Kader Khan as Gulathi
Asrani as Namdev (Step Son of Mahadev)
Shakti Kapoor as Janardhan / Dhan
Vijayendra Ghatge as Rajesh
Satyendra Kapoor as Postman Deen Dayal
Rita Bhaduri

Soundtrack

References

External links

1984 films
1980s Hindi-language films
Films directed by K. Raghavendra Rao
Hindi remakes of Telugu films
Films scored by Bappi Lahiri